MS Stena Nautica is a ro-pax ferry currently in operation between Halmstad and Grenå for Stena Line. She was completed in 1986 as MS Niels Klim and served on the DSB Århus – Kalundborg along with her sister MS Peder Paars until 1991.

Concept and construction
Although ordered by the ferry division of the Danish State Railways, the ships did not have the facilities for transporting trains, but were constructed to transport road freight and passengers. Both ships were named after characters from the works of Ludvig Holberg, a Norwegian-born writer considered to be the father of modern Danish literature. First of the ships, delivered in 1985, was named MS Peder Paars after the poem Peder Paars. The second, delivered a year later, was named MS Niels Klim after the protagonist in Niels Klim's Underground Travels.

Early career

That year both ships were taken over by Stena Line. The Peder Paars was renamed MS Stena Invicta and served on the Dover – Calais route for most of the 90s. The Niels Klim was renamed MS Stena Nautica but spent most of 1991 laid up in Århus. In 1992, she was chartered to B&I Line for use on their Irish Sea services and was renamed MS Isle Of Innisfree; Initially she served Pembroke Dock – Rosslare and later Holyhead – Dublin. However, her slow service speed of 17 knots frequently resulted in delays.

Current operations
In 1995, she returned to Stena Line and operated on their Lion Ferry subsidiary between Varberg / Halmstad and Grenå. She has since remained on that route, despite occasional charters, the closure of the Halmstad leg and the incorporation of Lion Ferry into Stena Line.

In 2002, she was rebuilt in order to transport more freight. Her lower passenger deck was converted into another vehicle deck, and her passenger certification was subsequently reduced from 2000 to 653, while her freight capacity increased from 604 lane meters to 1235.

Collision
On 16 February 2004, MS Stena Nautica had a mid channel collision with the freight ship, MS Joanna, in heavy fog. The Nautica was holed just above the engine room and took on a significant amount of water. Fortunately, sea conditions were calm, which meant the event could have been much worse. All passengers were evacuated to MS Stena Germanica. The Nautica was eventually towed to Varberg, and later to Gothenburg and Gdańsk for repairs. She reentered service four months later.

Fire 
On 24 January 2013 the Swedish Baltic Sea ferry has broken out in the early morning as the fire rescue headquarters in Gothenburg. On board was at the time of the fire, 77 passengers and 40 crew members. The truck erupted in a fire on the car deck and it was fast under control. The fire was not able to spread. The ferry was in the Kattegat on the way from Danish Grenå to Varberg in Sweden.

References

Ferries of Denmark
Ferries of Sweden
Nautica
Ships of the British and Irish Steam Packet Company
1985 ships